The 2023 Lamar Cardinals football team will represent Lamar University in the 2023 NCAA Division I FCS football season. The Cardinals will play their home games at Provost Umphrey Stadium in Beaumont, Texas, and will compete in the Southland Conference. They are led by first–year head coach Pete Rossomando.

Previous season

The Cardinals finished the season with a 1–10 overall record.  They were 1–5 in Southland Conference play. At the end of the season, head coach Blane Morgan was fired after going 5–23 in 3 seasons as the head coach of Lamar.

Schedule

References

Lamar
Lamar Cardinals football seasons
Lamar Cardinals football